Bihar has produced a number of poets and writers in its languages like Bhojpuri Maithili language, Magahi language, Angika and Bajjika including Bhikhari Thakur, Heera Dom, Viveki Rai,Satishwar Sahay Verma, Pandey Kapil etc are writers of Bhojpuri, Vidyapati in Maithili. Besides its regional languages, Bihar has also produced writers in English such as Raj Kamal Jha, Amitava Kumar, Tabish Khair, Gunjesh Bond, Abhay K, Siddhartha Chowdhury; and Hindi including Raja Radhika Raman Prasad Sinha, Kumar vansi, Acharya Ramlochan Saran, Acharya Shivpujan Sahay, Divakar Prasad Vidyarthy, Ramdhari Singh 'Dinkar', Ram Briksh Benipuri, Phanishwar Nath 'Renu', Gopal Singh "Nepali", Ramesh Chandra Jha and Baba Nagarjun. Writer and Buddhist scholar Mahapandit Rahul Sankrityayan was born in Uttar Pradesh but spent his life in the land of Buddha, i.e., Bihar. Hrishikesh Sulabh is a short story writer, playwright and theatre critic. Arun Kamal and Aalok Dhanwa are poets.

Languages

Magahi
Surendra Prasad 'Tarun'
Mathura Prasad 'Navin'
Shesh Anand Madhukar
R. Ishari 'Arshad'

Bhojpuri

Bhikhari Thakur was a Bhojpuri writer who has written several plays, poems and essays on social issues like women empowerment, poverty, migration, caste system etc. Bidesiya and Gabarghichor are one of the most famous plays written by him. Heera Dom, a Bhojpuri poet is credited for creating first poem on dalits. Rameshwar Singh Kashyap wrote the famous play Loha Singh. Raghuveer Narayan wrote the famous poem Batohiya.

Maithiili
Vidyapati Thakur is the most renowned poet of Maithili. (c. 14–15th century).
Usha Kiran Khan is a renowned Maithili writer.

Hindi
 
Ramdhari Singh 'Dinkar' 
Ram Briksh Benipuri
Phanishwar Nath 'Renu' 
Gopal Singh "Nepali"
Ramesh Chandra Jha 
 Baba Nagarjun
Raja Radhika Raman Prasad Sinha 
Kumar vansi
Acharya Ramlochan Saran
Acharya Shivpujan Sahay
Divakar Prasad Vidyarthy
 Hrishikesh Sulabh is a short story writer, playwright and theatre critic.
 Anamika_(poet)
 Arun Kamal 
 Aalok Dhanwa
 Savita Singh

Urdu
Different regional languages also have produced some prominent poets and authors.Sheen Muzaffarpuri is famous urdu writer Or Jurnalist Of Bihar. Raza Naqvi Wahi was the preeminent Indian Urdu language poet during his time, was born in Khujwan, Siwan, Bihar, and wrote many Urdu Poetry and also awarded as Ghalib Award.

English
Abhay K- poet, editor, translator and Ambassador, born in Nalanda district of Bihar. He has penned a memoir and nine collections of poetry. He is the first Indian poet to be invited at the Library of Congress to record his poems.
Amitava Kumar - author, journalist, and professor of English at Vassar College. He was born in Arrah district in Bihar. Author of Husband of a Fanatic, Bombay-London-New York, and Passport Photos
Raj Kamal Jha- novelist and news editor. His five novels have been translated into several languages.
Siddhartha Chowdhury " Patna Roughcut", Diksha at St. Martin's, Day Scholar, Patna Manual of Style, Ritwik & Hriday
Tabish Khair - poet and novelist, born in Gaya district of Bihar
R. K. Sinha - died in 2003. He was born in Munger district of Bihar. He was a gold medalist for his master of arts degree. He was awarded a D Phil from Oxford University in 1950
Satyapal Chandra has broken traditional stereotype in English literature by writing a number of English bestsellers of various genres
Uday Sahay "Making News, Media in Contemporary India (edited)" published by Oxford University Press, "Delhi, India in One City" published by Academic Foundation, and "Raj Bhavan of the Rising Arunachal Pradesh" published by SAUV Publication
Kunal Bhardwaj - Best selling author of English fiction “Love was Never Mine”. Probably the first English fiction author from the younger generation of Siwan. He was ranked as one of the top 5 romance novel debut author by Rediff.com.

Women Writers
Anamika_(poet)- Poet, author of several poetry collections
Nikita Singh - "Love @ Facebook
Savita Singh
Manna Bahadur The Dance of Death published by Penguin India March 2012
Mallika Nawal The Eleventh Commandment - An Introduction to Religio-Marketing and Religictionary - The A-Z of Religion are international books. Her Business Communication, published by Cengage Learning is a leading management textbook that is prescribed at several universities including Jawaharlal Nehru Technological University, Hyderabad. Her debut novel I'm a Woman & I'm on SALE was released on 16 December 2013 and has been dedicated to Nirbhaya.

Writers Born in Bihar
Sharat Chandra Chattopadhyay, writer in Bengali, resided for some time in Bihar. Indian writer in English Upamanyu Chatterjee also hails from Patna in Bihar. Devaki Nandan Khatri, who at the beginning of the 20th century wrote novels including Chandrakanta and Chandrakanta Santati, was born in Muzaffarpur, Bihar. Thriller writer Gunjesh Bond was born in Hajipur, Vaishali, Bihar. Writer and Buddhist scholar Mahapandit Rahul Sankrityayan was born in Uttar Pradesh but spent his life in the land of Buddha, i.e., Bihar. well known writer George Orwell was also born in Bihar.

References

Culture of Bihar
Indian literature by ethnic background